El Mirage is the sixth album by American singer-songwriter Jimmy Webb, released in May 1977 by Atlantic Records. This was the second
album for which Webb handed production and arrangement duties on to another person, George Martin, producer of the Beatles. The album is notable for containing "The Highwayman", a song that later provided both the name and first hit for the Highwaymen, a country supergroup comprising Johnny Cash, Waylon Jennings, Kris Kristofferson and Willie Nelson. Jennings also recorded the track "If You See Me Getting Smaller" for his album Ol Waylon (1977). The cover was photographed at El Mirage Lake, Mojave Desert, California.

Critical response
In his review for AllMusic, William Ruhlmann called the album "his most polished effort yet as a performer". Ruhlmann noted the "lush tracks full of tasty playing and warm string charts", and continued:

The AllMusic website gave the album four and a half out of five stars.

Track listing

Personnel

Music
 Jimmy Webb – vocals, keyboards
 George Martin – arranger, conductor, keyboards, synthesizer
 David Paich – keyboards, synthesizer
 Fred Tackett – guitar
 Dean Parks – guitar
 Lowell George – slide guitar
 Herb Pedersen – banjo, 12-string guitar, background vocals
 Harry Bluestone – concertmaster
 David Hungate – bass
 Larry Knechtel – bass
 Dee Murray – bass
 Harvey Mason – percussion
 Nigel Olsson – drums
 Jim Gordon – drums
 Kenny Loggins – vocals
 Billy Davis Jr. - vocals
 George Hawkins – vocals
 Sherlie Matthews – background vocals
 Susan Webb – background vocals
 Clydie King – background vocals

Production
 George Martin – producer
 John H. R. Mills – engineer
 John Mills – engineer
 George Tutko – engineer
 Bob Fisher – mastering
 Bob Defrin – art direction
 Steve Smith – photography
 Henry Diltz – cover photograph
 Richie Unterberger – liner notes

References

1977 albums
Albums arranged by George Martin
Albums conducted by George Martin
Albums produced by George Martin
Atlantic Records albums
Jimmy Webb albums